Gérard Xavier Marcel Depardieu, CQ (born 27 December 1948) is a  French actor, filmmaker, businessman and vineyard owner since 1989 who is one of the most prolific thespians in film history. He has completed over 250 films since 1967, almost exclusively as a lead. Depardieu has worked with over 150 film directors whose most notable collaborations include Jean-Luc Godard, François Truffaut, Maurice Pialat, Alain Resnais, Claude Chabrol, Ridley Scott and Bernardo Bertolucci. He is the second highest grossing actor in the history of French Cinema behind Louis de Funès. As of January 2022, his body of work also include countless television productions, 18 theatre plays, 16 records and 9 books. He is mostly known as a character actor and for having portrayed numerous leading historical and fictitious figures of the Western world including Georges Danton, Joseph Stalin, Honoré de Balzac, Alexandre Dumas, Auguste Rodin, Cyrano de Bergerac, Jean Valjean, Edmond Dantès, Christopher Columbus, Obélix, and Dominique Strauss-Kahn.

He is a Chevalier of the Légion d'honneur and Chevalier of the Ordre national du Mérite. He was granted citizenship of Russia in January 2013 (officially adopted name in ), and became a cultural ambassador of Montenegro during the same month.

He has received acclaim for his performances in The Last Metro (1980), for which he won the César Award for Best Actor, in Police (1985), for which he won the Volpi Cup for Best Actor, Jean de Florette (1986), and Cyrano de Bergerac (1990), for which he won the Best Actor award at the Cannes Film Festival and his second César Award for Best Actor as well as garnering a nomination for the Academy Award for Best Actor. He co-starred in Peter Weir's comedy Green Card (1991), winning a Golden Globe Award, and later acted in many big budget Hollywood films, including Ridley Scott's 1492: Conquest of Paradise (1992), Kenneth Branagh's Hamlet (1996), Randall Wallace's The Man in the Iron Mask (1998), and Ang Lee's Life of Pi (2012).

Early life

Gérard Depardieu was born on 27 December 1948 in Châteauroux, Indre, France. He is one of the five children of Anne Jeanne Josèphe (née Marillier) known as "La Lilette", stay-at-home mother, and René Maxime Lionel Depardieu (better known in his neighborhood as "Dédé" because he could only write two letters), a metal worker and volunteer fireman. His father and mother were both born in 1923 and both died in 1988.

Gérard Depardieu grew up in poverty in a two-room apartment at 39 rue du Maréchal-Joffre, Châteauroux, in a proletarian family with five brothers and sisters. Gérard helped his mother in the deliveries of his younger brothers and sisters. He spent more time on the streets than in school, leaving at the age of 13. Practically illiterate and half stammering, he learned to read only later. He worked at a printworks, while participating in boxing matches. He also became involved in selling stolen goods, and was put on probation.

During a difficult adolescence, he "got by", through committing theft and smuggling all kinds of goods (cigarettes, alcohol), among others with the GIs of the large American air base of Châteauroux-Déols. He also acted as a bodyguard for prostitutes who came down from Paris on weekends, the GIs' payday. His family nicknamed him "Pétard" or "Pétarou", because of the habit he had acquired of farting incessantly, in all places.

In 1968, his best friend of childhood Jacky Merveille, also a kingpin from Châteauroux, died in a car accident, and Depardieu decided to take his destiny in hand.

Acting career
At the age of sixteen, Depardieu left Châteauroux for Paris. There, he began acting in the new comedy theatre Café de la Gare, along with Patrick Dewaere, Romain Bouteille, Sotha, Coluche, and Miou-Miou. He studied theater under Jean-Laurent Cochet. Regardless his lack of culture, he heavily studied the classics and followed a therapy to correct his disastrous diction and memory. Moreover, through his first wife, Élisabeth Guignot, he discovered the Parisian bourgeoisie. Thus, he met Agnès Varda and her husband Jacques Demy. His first film role to gain attention was playing Jean-Claude in Bertrand Blier's comedy Les Valseuses (Going Places, 1974). Other prominent early films include Barbet Schroeder's controversial Maîtresse (1975), a starring role in Bernardo Bertolucci's historical epic 1900 (1976), with Robert De Niro, and a role in François Truffaut's The Last Metro (1980), with Catherine Deneuve for which he won his first César Award for Best Actor.

Depardieu's international profile rose as a result of his performance as a doomed, hunchbacked farmer in the film Jean de Florette (1986) and received notice for his starring role in Cyrano de Bergerac (1990), for which he won his second César Award for Best Actor, the Cannes Film Festival for Best Actor, and received a nomination for an Academy Award. Depardieu co-starred in Peter Weir's English language romantic comedy Green Card (1991), for which he won a Golden Globe Award. He has since had other roles in other English language films, including Ridley Scott's 1492: Conquest of Paradise (1992), Kenneth Branagh's Hamlet (1996), and Ang Lee's Life of Pi (2012). He played Obélix in the four live-action Astérix films in which he is said to have discovered Mélanie Laurent when she was fourteen.
In 2009, he took part in a rare performance of Sardou's La Haine at the Festival de Radio France et Montpellier Languedoc Roussillon, with Fanny Ardant; subsequently broadcast on France Musique.
In 2013, he starred in an independent film titled A Farewell to Fools.
Depardieu featured as a main character in Antwerp (Edinburgh Festival 2014), a play in The Europeans Trilogy (Bruges, Antwerp, Tervuren) by Paris-based UK playwright Nick Awde. In 2014, he starred in the controversial Welcome to New York in the thinly-disguised impersonation of disgraced former IMF chief Dominique Strauss-Kahn.

Personal life

In 1970, Depardieu married Élisabeth Guignot, with whom he had two children, actor Guillaume (1971–2008) and actress Julie (born 1973). On 28 January 1992, while separated from Guignot, he had a daughter, Roxanne, with the model Karine Silla (sister of producer Virginie Besson-Silla). In 1996, he divorced Guignot and began a relationship with actress Carole Bouquet, who was his partner from 1997 to 2005.

Depardieu  underwent heart surgery in July 2000. On 14 July 2006, he had a son, Jean, with French-Cambodian Hélène Bizot (daughter of François Bizot, not actress Hélène Bizot). Since 2005, Depardieu has lived with Clémentine Igou.

On 13 October 2008, Depardieu's son Guillaume died from pneumonia at the age of 37. Guillaume's health had been adversely affected by drug addiction and by a 1995 motorcycle crash that eventually required the amputation of his right leg in 2003. Depardieu and Guillaume had a turbulent relationship, but had reconciled prior to Guillaume's death.

In September 2020, Depardieu converted to Eastern Orthodox Christianity in Alexander Nevsky Cathedral in Paris.

Health 
On 18 May 1998, Depardieu had a motorcycle accident with a high blood alcohol content, of 2.5 g/L  on the way to the shooting of Asterix and Obelix vs. Caesar, by Claude Zidi. He was prescribed forty days off work.

In 2012 he was hit by a car while riding his scooter in Paris. The same year, while intoxicated with 1.8 g/L of alcohol in the blood, he had another scooter accident, without injury and without collision with another party. Since the 2000s, the actor has suffered at least seven motorcycle or scooter accidents.

Sexual assault and rape allegations
In a 1978 interview, Depardieu reportedly confirmed a story that he first participated in a rape when he was nine years old and that he had participated in more rapes since then. He reportedly stated there were "too many [rapes] to count... There was nothing wrong with it. The girls wanted to be raped. I mean, there's no such thing as rape. It's only a matter of a girl putting herself in a situation where she wants to be." The story re-emerged in Time magazine in 1991. On 15 March 1991, Depardieu's American publicist Lois Smith stated, "he's sorry, but it happened." The National Organization for Women requested an apology from Depardieu. Later that month, Depardieu's French publicist Claude Devy discounted the statements made by Smith, and Depardieu threatened legal action against any media outlet that published the comments. Depardieu's team said his words were mistranslated and he only admitted to having witnessed rapes. Time refused to retract the story.

In August 2018, Depardieu was accused of sexual assault and rape by a 22-year-old actress and dancer. The actress reported being assaulted twice by Depardieu in his home during rehearsal sessions. The unnamed actress made her statement to police in Lambesc, southern France, after which the case was passed to prosecutors in the capital. Depardieu denied the allegations. In 2019, the charges were dropped after a nine-month police investigation. The case was reopened in October 2020 after his accuser refiled the complaint. In February 2021, it was announced that French authorities charged Depardieu with rape in December 2020, stemming from the incident in August 2018. According to Depardieu's lawyer, Hervé Témime, speaking to Le Monde, the actor rejects the allegation. In March 2022, the Paris Court of Appeal rejected Depardieu's attempt to have the charges dropped and announced the actor will remain under formal investigation. Following this investigation, the case will either be brought to trial or dismissed.

Citizenship
Depardieu has been an official resident of Néchin, Belgium, since 7 December 2012. French Prime Minister Jean-Marc Ayrault criticised his move. On 15 December 2012, Depardieu publicly stated he was handing back his French passport. On 3 January 2013, Russian President Vladimir Putin signed an Executive Order granting Russian citizenship to Depardieu. In his first interview thereafter, Depardieu attacked Putin's critics for "lacking vision". In his autobiography, Depardieu said Putin "immediately liked my hooligan side." In February 2013, he registered as a resident of Saransk. Also in January 2013, he was appointed a cultural ambassador for Montenegro. In the summer of 2015, Depardieu's films were banned from television and cinemas in Ukraine due to his remarks questioning Ukraine's right to exist as an independent state. In February 2022, Depardieu revealed that he had become a citizen of the United Arab Emirates, although he did not specify when this occurred.

Awards
Depardieu has been nominated for the César for Best Actor in a Leading Role 17 times during his career and won it twice, in 1981 and 1991. He was also nominated for an Oscar in 1990 for his role in Cyrano de Bergerac.

1985: Volpi Cup for Best Actor for his role in Police
1985: Chevalier (Knight) of the Ordre national du Mérite
1990: Cannes Film Festival: Best actor award for his role in Cyrano de Bergerac
1996: Chevalier (Knight) of the Légion d'honneur
2006: Moscow Film Festival: Stanislavsky Award for the outstanding achievement in the career of acting

Filmography

See also
Cinema of France
List of celebrities who own wineries and vineyards

References

Further reading

External links

 Russian artist Shishkin writes portrait of Gerard Depardieu//Channel One
Photo of Gérard Depardieu

1948 births
Living people
20th-century French male actors
21st-century French male actors
Best Actor César Award winners
Best Actor Lumières Award winners
Best Musical or Comedy Actor Golden Globe (film) winners
Café de la Gare
Cannes Film Festival Award for Best Actor winners
Chevaliers of the Légion d'honneur
Converts to Eastern Orthodoxy from Roman Catholicism
French male film actors
Male actors from Paris
Knights of the Ordre national du Mérite
Knights of the National Order of Quebec
Male Shakespearean actors
Naturalised citizens of Russia
Naturalized citizens of the United Arab Emirates
People from Châteauroux
Russian people of French descent
Volpi Cup for Best Actor winners
Wine merchants
Russian activists against the 2022 Russian invasion of Ukraine
Gerard